Arthur Coates (10 August 1882 – 13 March 1955) was an English professional footballer who played as a full-back for various clubs in the early years of the 20th century.

Football career
Coates was born in Feetham, North Yorkshire but started his football career in the Greater Manchester area, first with Salford United before joining Heywood United of the Lancashire Combination.

In 1910, he was spotted by former England international Arthur Chadwick, then manager of Southern League team Exeter City. After a season at Exeter, Coates moved along the south coast to join fellow Southern League team, Southampton as a replacement for right-back Jack Eastham who had just retired.

Coates made his debut for the "Saints" in the opening match of the 1912–13 season, a 2–2 draw with Northampton Town. Nine matches into the season, he lost his place to the veteran Bert Lee but returned in December. Despite showing "early promise", his form faded as the season went on and in March he was dropped in favour of Richard Brooks.

In the summer of 1913, Coates was released and returned to Lancashire to re-join Heywood United.

References

1882 births
1955 deaths
Footballers from North Yorkshire
Footballers from Yorkshire
English footballers
Association football fullbacks
Salford United F.C. players
Heywood United F.C. players
Exeter City F.C. players
Southampton F.C. players
Southern Football League players